Anna Semyonorna Ingerman (née Amitin; May 27, 1868 – May 19, 1931) was a Russian-born Jewish-American physician and socialist.

Early life and education
Ingerman was born on May 27, 1868 in Vyetka, Russia, near the city of Gomel.

Ingerman attended gymnasium, the most prestigious form of secondary schooling in Russia at the time. In the late 1880s, she moved to Bern, Switzerland and studied medicine. While there, she joined Georgi Plekhanov's Group for the Emancipation of Labor (GEL), the first Russian Marxist organization. She graduated from the University of Bern in 1893.

Career
Ingerman immigrated to America shortly after her husband Sergius, who immigrated in 1891, and they settled in New York City. She was a member of the Socialist Labor Party, the Social Democratic Party of America in the late 1890s, the Socialist Party since its inception, and Russian Social-Democracy organizations in New York. She was a lecturer and teacher for numerous Russian, German, Jewish, and American study circles, women's clubs, and workingmen's societies connected to the socialist movement. In 1893, she founded the Arbeterin Fareyn (Workingwomen's Circle) with Adella Kean Zametkin and several other women, and in 1895 she led four thousand Jewish women who marched under its banner in the 1895 May Day Parade. She and Sergius established the Russian Social Democratic Society, which raised funds for the GEL and the Russian Social Democratic Workers' Party. She and Sergius were also ambassadors for the latter party's Menshevik wing.

Ingerman and Sergius visited Russia shortly after the 1905 Russian Revolution began, hoping the Czar would be overthrown. They stayed in Russia for three years, after which they returned to America. They again returned to Russia after the 1917 Revolution, staying there for six months while Ingerman helped wounded people injured during the uprising. After returned to America, they spoke out against the regime of Lenin and Trotsky, claiming the true socialist faction was violently opposed to communism. She opposed the Soviet regime ever since, claiming she was against the Bolsheviks since 1905. In America, she was associated in her socialist work with Morris Hillquit and Algernon Lee. She also wrote socialist articles for newspapers in English and other languages, including the New York Call, the New Yorker Volkszeitung, the Novy Mir, and the Narodnaya Gazeta.

In the 1926 United States House of Representatives election, Ingerman was the Socialist candidate in New York's 17th congressional district. She lost to Democrat William W. Cohen. In the 1927 New York City aldermanic election, she was the Socialist candidate for the New York City Board of Aldermen in Manhattan's 9th District, losing to Democrat Dennis J. Mahon. In 1928, she ran for the New York State Assembly as a Socialist in New York County's 15th District. She lost to Republican Abbot Low Moffat. In 1929, she again for the Assembly as a Socialist in New York County's 9th District, losing to Democrat Ira H. Holley.

Ingerman met Sergius Ingerman, a fellow medical student and socialist, while living in Bern. They married in May 1889. They had a daughter, Dr. Eugenia Ingerman Low. Her son-in-law Bela Low was a metallurgical expert for the War Production Board, and her grandson was Francis E. Low.

Death
Ingerman died in the Polyclinic Hospital following a severe surgery on May 19, 1931. Around 2,000 people attended her funeral in The Jewish Daily Forward Building, including Algernon Lee, Abraham Cahan, Morris Hillquit, and Bertha H. Mailly. Lee presided over the funeral. She was cremated at Fresh Pond Crematory.

References

External links 
 The Political Graveyard

1868 births
1931 deaths
People from Vietka District
People from Gomelsky Uyezd
American people of Belarusian-Jewish descent
Jews from the Russian Empire
Emigrants from the Russian Empire to the United States
University of Bern alumni
19th-century American women physicians
19th-century American physicians
20th-century American women physicians
20th-century American physicians
Physicians from New York City
Jewish American people in New York (state) politics
New York (state) socialists
Members of the Socialist Labor Party of America
Social Democratic Party of America politicians
Socialist Party of America politicians from New York (state)